BushVision was a free-to-air community television station based in Mount Gambier, South Australia. The station began broadcasting on 23 September 2005 on UHF 37 on a 12-month trial licence that was twice extended for a total of 18 months. From its original launch, BushVision had plans to broadcast nationally throughout regional Australia, using Mount Gambier as an initial testing area, but these plans were rejected by the Australian Communications and Media Authority. The station later closed on 4 March 2007 when their licence expired.

See also

 Community television in Australia
 Television broadcasting in Australia

References

Australian community television
Television stations in South Australia
English-language television stations in Australia
Television channels and stations established in 2005
Defunct television channels in Australia
Television channels and stations disestablished in 2007
2005 establishments in Australia
2007 disestablishments in Australia